Marta Golden (November 28, 1868 – July 15, 1943) was an American stage and film actress.

Born Lillian Marta Golden in Pennsylvania, she made her film debut in the 1915 Charlie Chaplin-directed short Work. She would appear in approximately seven motion pictures, often in comedies directed and starring Chaplin. Her last appearance in a motion picture was in the 1928 Edwin Carewe-directed drama Revenge, starring Dolores del Río.

Golden died in Los Angeles, California in 1943.

Filmography

References

External links
 
 

1868 births
1943 deaths
American film actresses
American silent film actresses
20th-century American actresses
American stage actresses
Actresses from Pennsylvania